The list of historical harbour cranes includes historical harbour cranes from the Middle Ages to the introduction of metal cranes in the Industrial Revolution during the 19th century. Modern reconstructions are also listed.

References

See also 
Treadwheel crane

Harbour cranes

de:Hafenkran#Liste historischer Hafenkräne